The Beckwith Company was a publishing entity in 1920, based in New York City. It is remembered for publishing a second edition of the forged Protocols of the Elders of Zion, more specifically a second translation from the Russian language into the English language.

The Beckwith edition of the Protocols of the Elders of Zion

The meaning of the lead title is the expression, "Praemonitus praemunitus," a Latin saying which means "forewarned is forearmed." The anonymous editor of this edition was Harris A. Houghton. The translation was by his personal assistant Miss de Bogory and former Russian General G. J. Sosnowsky.

The pseudonym under which this imprint was published, "Peter Beckwith," is believed to be Harris A. Houghton, suggesting further that "The Beckwith Company" was merely a front for Houghton to get his new translation of The Protocols of the Elders of Zion published. This publishing entity was a front created specifically in order to provide a publishing company willing and able to publish and distribute the Protocols. Support and/or financing for this publication came is believed to have come from the American Defense Society.

Other books published by Beckwith
There are fewer than half a dozen imprints associated with the "Beckwith" label in libraries. One title is particularly interesting, and for several reasons. It is the following:

The author, Nesta H. Webster is a recognized antisemite, and she herself was involved in the promotion of the Protocols of Zion.

There is another known work by this entity, namely, Sales Letters for Salesmen. But publisher is located in Dowagiac, Mich. The publisher is styled "The Beckwith Company" and the copyright year is given as 1922. The author is given as Edward G. Weir.

See also
American Defense Society
Boris Brasol
Cause of World Unrest
Harris A. Houghton
Natalie de Bogory
Nesta H. Webster
Protocols of the Elders of Zion
Protocols of the Elders of Zion (versions)
Praemonitus Praemunitus
Serge Nilus
Singerman list
Warrant for Genocide

References

Robert Singerman
The American Career of the "Protocols of the Elders of Zion"
American Jewish History
Vol. 71 (1981), pp. 48-78

Antisemitic propaganda: an annotated bibliography and research guide
Foreword by Colin Holmes
(New York: Garland, 1982)

Edward G. Weir
Sales letters for salesmen
(Dowagiac, Mich.: The Beckwith Company, 1922)

External links
Jewish Virtual Library, The Protocols Come to America 

Protocols of the Elders of Zion
Book publishing companies based in New York (state)